The Warehouse District in central Toledo, Ohio has seen an upturn with new residential and entertainment developments alongside many in-use warehouses and warehouses that are in the process of being renovated. The district has been the epicenter of recent revitalization efforts of downtown Toledo. A wide variety of bars and restaurants can be found in this district. Hensville is a pedestrian mall that is located directly behind the Fifth Third Field and is a hub of live entertainment. The Warehouse District is immediately south of Downtown and is roughly bordered by Swan Creek, Monroe Street, Ontario Street, the Anthony Wayne Trail and I-75.

Attractions

20 N Gallery (Art gallery)
Erie Street Market
Fifth Third Field (Mud Hens Baseball)
Oliver House
St. Patrick's Catholic Church
Sur St. Clair (Art gallery)
Toledo Art Walk
Downtown Latte' Coffeehouse
Blarney Irish Pub
Pizza Papalis
Frickers
Packo's at the Park
Ye Olde Cock 'n Bull Tavern
Spaghetti Warehouse
Ye Olde Durty Bird
Bronze Boar
The Retirement Group
Martin Wood Appraisal
NBS
Paul Sullivan Architecture
Gathered Glass Blowing Hotshop & Gallery
Ahava Beauty Salon
Bartley Lofts
Standart Lofts
Ottawa Condos
Kengo Sushi & Yakitori
M'Osteria and Bar
Black Cloister Brewing Company
Table Forty 4

References

External links
Toledo Warehouse District Association

Neighborhoods in Toledo, Ohio